Gymnanthera is a genus of vines in the family Apocynaceae (previously Asclepiadaceae), first described as a genus in 1810. It is native to China, Southeast Asia, and Australia.

Selected species
Gymnanthera cunninghamii (Benth.) P.I.Forst. - Enderby Island + Dampier Archipelago of Western Australia
Gymnanthera oblonga  (Burm.f.) P.S.Green - S China (Guangdong, Hainan), Cambodia, Indonesia, Malaysia, New Guinea, Philippines, Thailand, Vietnam; Australia

References

Apocynaceae genera
Periplocoideae